San Pablo de Borbur is a town and municipality in the Colombian Department of Boyacá, part of the subregion of the Western Boyacá Province. The three most important productive sectors are agriculture, livestock and mining, with the emerald being one of the representative elements of the region.

References

External links 

Municipalities of Boyacá Department